Radio Kozara is a Bosnian local commercial radio station, broadcasting from Gradiška/Bosanska Gradiška, Bosnia and Herzegovina. Radio station was launched on 17 July 2017.

This radio station broadcasts a variety of programs such as music and local news. The owner of the radio station is the company GRUBEX RD d.o.o. Gradiška.

After BHRT has abandoned the launch of the BH Radio 2 program, reserved frequencies were allocated to other interested stations across Bosnia and Herzegovina through the competition where company GRUBEX RD d.o.o. Gradiška met the criteria and it received an additional FM frequency and increased their coverage.

The program is mainly produced in Serbian at two FM frequencies and it is available in the city of Gradiška/Bosanska Gradiška and Banja Luka  as well as in nearby municipalities in Croatia.

Estimated number of listeners of Radio Kozara is around 93,357.

Frequencies
 Gradiška/Bosanska Gradiška  
 Banja Luka

See also 
 List of radio stations in Bosnia and Herzegovina
 Radio Gradiška
 Big Radio 1
 BH Radio 1
 Hard Rock Radio
 Plavi FM
 Radio UNO

References

External links 
 www.radiostanica.ba
 www.fmscan.org
 Communications Regulatory Agency of Bosnia and Herzegovina

Gradiška
Radio stations established in 2017
Mass media in Banja Luka